R. Nimal K. Bandara was the third Chief Minister of North Western Province. He was appointed on 27 August 1994 succeeding G. M. Premachandra and was Chief Minister until 28 January 1999. He was succeeded by S. B. Nawinne.

References

Chief Ministers of North Western Province, Sri Lanka